The Evangelical Seminary of Puerto Rico —or Seminario Evangélico de Puerto Rico (SEPR) in Spanish — is a private mainline Protestant seminary in Río Piedras, Puerto Rico.  It offers graduate studies in religion. It was founded on September 11, 1919, by a group of theological schools and biblical institutes of the Protestant denominations that came to Puerto Rico after the Spanish–American War. This seminary is currently sponsored by the American Baptist Churches USA, the Iglesia Evangélica Unida de Puerto Rico (IEUPR) (affiliated until June 10, 2006, with the United Church of Christ), the Evangelical Lutheran Church in America, the United Methodist Church, and the Presbyterian Church (U.S.A.) and the Christian Church (Disciples of Christ). The seminary has retained its ties to the United Church of Christ even as the IEUPR has severed them.

SEPR is accredited by the Association of Theological Schools in the United States and Canada, the Council on Higher Education of Puerto Rico, and the Middle States Association of Colleges and Schools.

External links

 Seminario Evangélico de Puerto Rico - official site, in Spanish.

1919 establishments in Puerto Rico
Presbyterian Church (USA) seminaries
Seminaries and theological colleges in Puerto Rico
Universities and colleges in Puerto Rico
Educational institutions established in 1919
Interdenominational seminaries and theological colleges